This Christmas is the third album (and first Christmas album) by 98 Degrees. The album sold over 1 million copies in the US alone and spawned the Top 40 hit single "This Gift".

Track listing
"If Every Day Could Be Christmas" – 5:04
"God Rest You Merry, Gentlemen" – 4:36
"The Christmas Song" – 4:08
"I'll Be Home for Christmas" – 2:04
"O Holy Night" – 3:20
"This Gift" – 4:08
"The Little Drummer Boy" – 3:25
"Christmas Wish" – 3:49
"Silent Night" – 3:09
"Ave Maria (Bach/Gounod)" – 1:56
"This Gift" (Pop Version) – 4:09

Charts

Weekly charts

Year-end charts

Certifications

References

1999 Christmas albums
Christmas albums by American artists
Pop Christmas albums
98 Degrees albums
Universal Records albums
Motown albums
Covers albums